This is a list of mountains in Laos.

 Phou Bia, 2,817 m
 Phu Xai Lai Leng, 2,720 m
 Rao Co, 2,286 m
 Phou Louey, 2,257 m, located at Lat/Lon {20.27057, 103.19746}
 Phu Soi Dao, 2,120 m
 Pu Ke, 2,079 m
 Shiceng Dashan, 1,830 m
 Dong Ap Bia, 937 m

References 

Laos